Manuel Huerga (born 20 October 1957) is a Spanish film director and screenwriter. His film Salvador (Puig Antich) was screened in the Un Certain Regard section at the 2006 Cannes Film Festival.

Selected filmography

Film
 Brutal Ardour (1978; short film)
 Gaudí (1989)
 Antártida (1995)
 Salvador (Puig Antich) (2006)

Television
 Arsenal (1985-1987)
 Operación Malaya (2011)
 14 d'abril. Macià contra Companys (2011)
 Barcelona, la rosa de foc (2014)
 All or Nothing: Manchester City (2016; 8 episodes)
 Nit i dia (2016-2017; 15 episodes)

References

External links

1957 births
Living people
Spanish film directors
Spanish male screenwriters
People from Barcelona